Gazli is a city in Bukhara Region, Uzbekistan. It is part of Romitan District. Its population was 8,200 in 2001, and 8,100 in 2016.

References

Populated places in Bukhara Region
Cities in Uzbekistan